Ambanpola Divisional Secretariat is a  Divisional Secretariat  of Kurunegala District, of North Western Province, Sri Lanka, which provides developmental planning to the Kurunegala District.

The stated mission of the Ambanpola Divisional Secretariat is to

"upgrade the living standard of the people through efficient, Sustainable and planned development process with people

participation and providing government services according to the government policies."

Main Services Provided 

 Civil Registrations
 Issuance of permits and licenses
 Issuing of certificates
 Payment of pensions
 Land administration
 Samurdhi Program
 Procurements
 Social Welfare and Benefits
 Development Program

References

 Divisional Secretariats Portal

Divisional Secretariats of Kurunegala District